Andriy Sahaydak (born 2 January 1989) is a professional Ukrainian football defender who currently plays for FC Karpaty Lviv in the Ukrainian Premier League. He is the product of the Karpaty Lviv Youth School System.

On 24 February 2011, Sahaydak joined Chornomorets on a 6-month loan from Karpaty, with the right of purchase for the Odesa club
. At season's end, the right was not exercised, though.

References

External links 
Website Karpaty Profile
Profile on EUFO
Profile on Football Squads

1989 births
Living people
Ukrainian footballers
FC Karpaty Lviv players
Association football defenders